Den grønne heisen is a 1981 Norwegian comedy film directed by Odd-Geir Sæther, based on a play by Avery Hopwood, and starring Rolv Wesenlund and Øivind Blunck.

Plot
Preben invites Mrs. Lissen to the opera, and later she says she wants a divorce from Fredrik. It develops into a hide-and-seek hunt for the truth.

Cast
 Rolv Wesenlund as Fredrik Borkmann
 Marie Louise Tank as Lissen Borkmann
 Øivind Blunck as Einar Lorck Mathiesen
 Elsa Lystad as Topsy Lorck Mathiesen
 Anders Hatlo as Preben Bang
 Brit Elisabeth Haagensli as Dagny

External links
 
 

1981 films
1981 comedy films
Norwegian comedy films
1980s Norwegian-language films